Karan Sharma (born 31 October 1998) is an Indian cricketer. He made his Twenty20 debut on 10 January 2021, for Uttar Pradesh in the 2020–21 Syed Mushtaq Ali Trophy. He made his List A debut on 20 February 2021, for Uttar Pradesh in the 2020–21 Vijay Hazare Trophy. In February 2022, he was bought by the Lucknow Super Giants in the auction for the 2022 Indian Premier League tournament. He made his first-class debut on 17 February 2022, for Uttar Pradesh in the 2021–22 Ranji Trophy.

References

External links
 

1998 births
Living people
Indian cricketers
Uttar Pradesh cricketers
Lucknow Super Giants cricketers
Place of birth missing (living people)